In My Stride is an album by David Ruffin, released in 1977. It was his last studio album for Motown Records.

Critical reception
The Bay State Banner wrote that "even in the most [Lou] Rawls-inspired copy cuts, the bluesy soul of Ruffin the man squirms out, mocking the thickly cosmetic contrivance of his Van McCoy-produced work."

Track listing
All Tracks composed by Van McCoy; except where indicated
"You're My Peace of Mind"
"Just Let Me Hold You for a Night" (Charles H. Kipps, Jr.)
"I Can't Stop the Rain" (Charles H. Kipps, Jr.)
"Nightmare"
"Questions" (Charles H. Kipps, Jr.)
"I'm Jealous"
"Hey Woman"
"There's More to Love"
"Rode by the Place (Where We Used to Stay)" (Marv Johnson)

Chart history

Singles

References

1977 albums
Motown albums
David Ruffin albums